Willem "Wim" Peters (5 July 1903 – 30 March 1995) was a Dutch athlete who competed in the 1924 Summer Olympics, in the 1928 Summer Olympics, and in the 1932 Summer Olympics.  Peters was born in Meppel and died in Zwolle aged 91.

References

External links
 
 
 
 

1903 births
1995 deaths
Dutch male triple jumpers
Olympic athletes of the Netherlands
Athletes (track and field) at the 1924 Summer Olympics
Athletes (track and field) at the 1928 Summer Olympics
Athletes (track and field) at the 1932 Summer Olympics
People from Meppel
European Athletics Championships medalists
Sportspeople from Drenthe